Olivia Spiker (born November 24, 1981 in Schwelm as Olivia Luczak) is a Polish-German female amateur boxer. She lives in Wuppertal and studied safety engineering at University of Wuppertal.

Career
Olivia Spiker is four-time West German champion, third placed at the German championships in 2004 and 2005, German champion of the year 2006 and 2008 in German middleweight and champion of the year 2007, 2009, 2010 and 2011 in the welter. In the Polish Championships in 2006 she won the Vice title and was Silesian Champion 2007 and Polish champion 2008, 2010 and 2011. She is the recipient of the honorary needle NABV and in 2007 with the sports Honorary Medal of the city of Wuppertal Award. Olivia Spiker has with the Polish women's national team at the European Championships 2007 in Vejle/ Denmark, where she was Vice-Europe champion. In 2009, she won the German University Championships in Cologne.

References

External links
 Official website 

1981 births
Living people
German women boxers
Polish women boxers
German people of Polish descent
People from Schwelm
Sportspeople from Arnsberg (region)
Welterweight boxers
University of Wuppertal alumni